The Ypsilanti Courier is a weekly newspaper based in Ypsilanti, Michigan. The Ypsilanti Courier is part of Heritage Newspapers, a conglomerate of weekly newspapers in Washtenaw County owned by 21st Century Media, part of Digital First Media. The newspaper provides news, life, sports and entertainment news from Ypsilanti and Washtenaw County, Michigan.

References

External links

 

Newspapers published in Michigan
Weekly newspapers published in the United States
Washtenaw County, Michigan
Ypsilanti, Michigan
21st Century Media publications
Digital First Media
Publishing companies established in 1994
1994 establishments in Michigan